Jacek Tylicki (born 1951 in Sopot, Poland) is a Polish artist who settled in New York City in 1982. Tylicki works in the field of land art, installation art, and site-specific art. His conceptual projects often raise social and environmental issues.

Works
Starting in 1973, Tylicki began sending sheets of canvas or paper into the wind, rivers, or forests and leaving them for a long while in a natural environment, thus forcing upon nature an attitude previously reserved to the artist: the creation of forms. The project is often called natural art.

In the years 1974–1990, he initiated the idea of an anonymous artist by issuing a periodical called Anonymous Artists where artists could present their art without revealing their own names. In 1985 he created an installation called Chicken Art. Tylicki transformed the Now Gallery in Manhattan to a hen house in which live chickens watched realistic paintings of chickens, chicks and roosters hanging on the gallery walls. 
Tylicki declared:

Another installation was the Free Art, where Tylicki invited well-known artists, including Mark Kostabi and Rodney Greenblat, to give away their art to the public for free. Video and photography play an important role in his work as a record of its elusiveness and transience.

In 2019, Tylicki and his daughter, Michelle, created "Art Wars" a street art performance in London. It was a recreation of Tylicki's performance in the East Village in the 1980s.

Exhibitions
Tylicki has exhibited his work internationally; a selection of group shows include: Land Art Mongolia Bienalle, Gobi desert, Mongolia (2016);
Mananchira, Calicut, India (2015); Museum of Contemporary Art in Kraków (MOCAK), Poland (2013); Dublin Biennial, Ireland (2012); Zacheta National Gallery of Art, Warsaw, Poland (2012);

Solo exhibitions include: those at Galerie Kanal 2, Copenhagen, Denmark (1980); Galeria BWA, Sopot, Poland (1980); Galerie Sudurgata 7, Reykjavik, Iceland (1980); Gallery 38, Copenhagen, Denmark (1979); Galeria Sien Gdanska, Gdansk, Poland (1979); Galerie St. Petri, Lund, Sweden (1979); Galeria Akumulatory 2, Poznan, Poland (1979);Galerie Sudurgata 7, Reykjavik, Iceland (1979); Gallerie Porten, Lund, Sweden (1976); BTJ Gallery, Lund, Sweden (1976)

Collections
Bunkier Sztuki Collection at Gallery of Contemporary Art, Krakow

References

Sources
 Leszek Brogowski, "Jacek Tylicki and a new ethos of art", Project magazine, Poland, 202-203/1995 p. 41-53
 Les Krantz, The New York Art Review, 1988,, p. 1218-1229
Now Gallery, Artforum March 1985. 
 Laura Cottingham, "Free Art", Art & Auction Magazine, June 1987, p. 24
 EAST VILLAGE 85: A guide. A Documentary, Pelham, 1985. 
"New Art Now" Nowy Dziennik, New York, 12-09-1985 
 New York Magazine, November 18, 1985, p. 121 
 Who's Who in Polish America, Bicentennial Pub. Corp., 1996, p. 473
 Artbibliographies Modern, Cambridge Scientific Abstracts, v. 28, no. 1 - 1997, str. 708 1 - 1997, p. 708

External links

 
 

1951 births
Living people
American conceptual artists
Polish conceptual artists
Polish contemporary artists
Land artists
American installation artists
Polish installation artists
Postmodern artists
Polish emigrants to the United States
Artists from New York (state)